The Nastro d'Argento (Silver Ribbon) is a film award assigned each year, since 1946, by Sindacato Nazionale dei Giornalisti Cinematografici Italiani ("Italian National Syndicate of Film Journalists") the association of Italian film critics.

This is the list of Nastro d'Argento awards for Best Actress. Mariangela Melato  and Margherita Buy are the record holder with five Nastro d'Argento awards for Best Actress received, followed by Anna Magnani four times winners.

1940s 
1946 - Clara Calamai - The Adulteress
1947 - Alida Valli - Eugenie Grandet
1948 - Anna Magnani - L'onorevole Angelina
1949 - Anna Magnani - L'Amore

1950s 
1950 - not awarded
1951 - Pier Angeli - Tomorrow Is Too Late
1952 - Anna Magnani - Bellissima
1953 - Ingrid Bergman - Europa '51
1954 - Gina Lollobrigida - Bread, Love and Dreams
1955 - Silvana Mangano - The Gold of Naples
1956 - not awarded
1957 - Anna Magnani - Suor Letizia
1958 - Giulietta Masina - Nights of Cabiria
1959 - not awarded

1960s 
1960 - Eleonora Rossi Drago - Violent Summer
1961 - Sophia Loren - Two Women
1962 - not awarded
1963 - Gina Lollobrigida - Venere Imperiale
1964 - Silvana Mangano -  The Verona Trial
1965 - Claudia Cardinale - Bebo's Girl
1966 - Giovanna Ralli - The Escape
1967 - Lisa Gastoni - Wake Up and Die
1968 - not awarded
1969 - Monica Vitti - The Girl with the Pistol

1970s 
1970 - Paola Pitagora - Unknown Woman
1971 - Ottavia Piccolo - Metello
1972 - Mariangela Melato - The Working Class Goes to Heaven
1973 - Mariangela Melato - The Seduction of Mimi
1974 - Laura Antonelli - Malicious
1975 - Lisa Gastoni - Bitter Love
1976 - Monica Vitti - Duck in Orange Sauce
1977 - Mariangela Melato - Caro Michele
1978 - Sophia Loren - A Special Day
1979 - Mariangela Melato - To Forget Venice

1980s 
1980 - Ida Di Benedetto - Immacolata and Concetta: The Other Jealousy
1981 - Mariangela Melato - Help Me Dream
1982 - Eleonora Giorgi - Talcum Powder
1983 - Giuliana De Sio - The Pool Hustlers
1984 - Lina Sastri - Where's Picone?
1985 - Claudia Cardinale - Claretta
1986 - Giulietta Masina - Ginger and Fred
1987 - Valeria Golino - A Tale of Love  
1988 - Ornella Muti - Me and My Sister
1989 - Ornella Muti - Private Access

1990s 
1990 - Virna Lisi - Merry Christmas... Happy New Year
1991 - Margherita Buy - The Station
1992 - Francesca Neri - I thought it was love, but it was a barouche
1993 - Antonella Ponziani - Way South
1994 - Chiara Caselli - Where Are You? I'm Here
1995 - Sabrina Ferilli - La bella vita
1996 - Anna Bonaiuto - Nasty Love
1997 
Iaia Forte - Luna e l'altra  
Virna Lisi - Follow Your Heart
1998 - Francesca Neri - Live Flesh  (in Spanish language) 
1999 - Giovanna Mezzogiorno - Of Lost Love

2000s 
2000 - Licia Maglietta - Bread and Tulips
2001 - Margherita Buy - The Ignorant Fairies
2002 - Valeria Golino - Respiro
2003 - Giovanna Mezzogiorno - The Cruelest Day and Facing Windows 
2004 - Jasmine Trinca, Adriana Asti, Sonia Bergamasco and Maya Sansa - The Best of Youth   
2005 - Laura Morante - Love Is Eternal While It Lasts
2006 - Katia Ricciarelli  - The Second Wedding Night
2007 - Margherita Buy - Saturn in Opposition and The Caiman 
2008 - Margherita Buy - Days and Clouds
2009 - Giovanna Mezzogiorno - Vincere

2010s 
2010 - Micaela Ramazzotti, Stefania Sandrelli - The First Beautiful Thing
2011 - Alba Rohrwacher - The Solitude of Prime Numbers
2012 - Micaela Ramazzotti - A Flat for Three and The Big Heart of the Girls
2013 - Jasmine Trinca - There Will Come a Day and Miele
2014 - Kasia Smutniak - Fasten Your Seatbelts
2015 - Margherita Buy - Mia Madre
2016 - Valeria Bruni Tedeschi, Micaela Ramazzotti - Like Crazy
2017 - Jasmine Trinca - Fortunata
2018 - Elena Sofia Ricci - Loro
2019 - Anna Foglietta - Un giorno all'improvviso

2020s 
2020 - Jasmine Trinca - The Goddess of Fortune
2021 - Teresa Saponangelo - Il buco in testa
2022 - Teresa Saponangelo - The Hand of God (È stata la mano di Dio)

See also 
 David di Donatello for Best Actress
 Cinema of Italy

References

External links 
 Italian National Syndicate of Film Journalists official site  

Nastro d'Argento
Film awards for lead actress